Avtozavodskaya (lit. auto factory) is a station on the Zamoskvoretskaya line of the Moscow Metro. It is named for the nearby Zavod Imeni Likhacheva where ZIS and ZIL limousines were built. The train station was opened in 1943, a few months before Novokuznetskaya and Paveletskaya. The architect was Alexey Dushkin. From 1943 to 1969 when Kakhovskaya opened, it was the southern terminus of the line. The station has entrances to Avtozavodskaya and Masterkov streets.

History
When the station was opened in 1943 it was named Zavod imeni Stalina after the factory at the site. As part of the destalinization process, the factory's name changed to Zavod Imeni Likhacheva in 1956 and the station became Avtozavodskaya. Parts of the former factory have been demolished to accommodate the construction of a residential complex; however the name remains in place.

Both the tall pillars and walls are faced with pinkish Oraktuoy marble. Additionally, Avtozavodskaya is decorated with eight mosaics depicting events of the Great Patriotic War.

On February 6, 2004, a suicide bomber set off an explosion between Avtozavodskaya and Paveletskaya in which 41 people were killed and 250 were injured.

References

External links

metro.ru
mymetro.ru
KartaMetro.info – Station location and exits on Moscow map (English/Russian)

Moscow Metro stations
Railway stations in Russia opened in 1943
Zamoskvoretskaya Line
Railway stations located underground in Russia
Cultural heritage monuments of regional significance in Moscow